Aaron Scott Moorhead (born March 3, 1987) is an American film director, producer, cinematographer, editor, and actor. He is best known for his work with creative partner Justin Benson.

Life and career 
Moorhead grew up in Tarpon Springs and attended Palm Harbor University High School. 

His partnership with writer and producer Justin Benson generated two critically acclaimed feature films, 2012 horror Resolution and 2014 romantic body horror film Spring, which premiered at the 2014 Toronto International Film Festival. In both, Moorhead acts as co-director, producer and director of photography.

His work with Benson can also be found in the segment "Bonestorm" of the American anthology horror film V/H/S: Viral.

Their film The Endless premiered in competition at the Tribeca Film Festival in 2017, and was acquired for distribution in 2018 by Well Go USA Entertainment.

Filmography
Film

Television

References

External links 
 
 

Living people
Place of birth missing (living people)
American cinematographers
People from Tarpon Springs, Florida
Florida State University alumni
1987 births
Film directors from Florida